Lepidochrysops chala is a butterfly in the family Lycaenidae. It is found in Tanzania and Zambia. The habitat consists of rocky grassland and montane grassland at altitudes of 2,000 to 2,200 meters.

Adults are attracted to flowers of low-growing plants. They are on wing from August to early October.

References

Butterflies described in 1980
Lepidochrysops